Prosopocerini is a tribe of longhorn beetles of the subfamily Lamiinae. It was described by Thomson in 1868.

Taxonomy
 Bangalaia Duvivier, 1890
 Bangaloides Breuning & Téocchi, 1975
 Parabangalaia Breuning, 1946
 Paraprotomocerus Breuning, 1966
 Prosopocera Dejean, 1835
 Protomocerus Gahan, 1898

References

 
Lamiinae